Jean Houymet or Wuillemet or Ouimet (September 6, 1634 – November 18, 1687), son of Nicolas and Pérette Nicayse, originated from Vrigny, archdiocese of Reims located in the province of Champagne department of Marne in France. He was one of the earliest French settlers of New France, having arrived in 1659.

Biography
According to Roland-J. Auger (1921-1982); a professional genealogist and former president of the Genealogical Society of Quebec; Jean Houymet crossed over to New France in 1659 on the ship called "Le Sacrifice d'Abraham" in the company of the first bishop of New France, François de Laval. Jean Houymet landed in Québec City on Monday, June 16 at around 6 pm. This fact was taken from the series of books titled "The Jesuit Relations".

In New France, more precisely at Château-Richer, he was hired to work for Guillaume Thibault. In November 1659, he bought a plot of land measuring 2 arpents of frontage (about ) on the Saint Lawrence River near a stream named "La Rivière du Sault-à-la-Puce".

The spelling as "Houymet" is the one written by the notary Claude Aubert, when he signed the marriage contract of Jean Houymet and Renée Gagnon, daughter of Jean and Marguerite Cauchon, October 3, 1660 in the seignory of Beaupré. On the same document, Jean Houymet indicated his mark at the bottom of the marriage contract with the letter "W", which seems to suggest that the family name may have originally been "Wuillemet," as was noted in the archives of the Marne department in France.

The first child of this couple, a boy also named Jean, was born in the fall of 1661 in the parish of La Visitation de Notre-Dame (Our Lady of the Visitation) located in Château-Richer. On April 10, 1662, a few months after the birth of this first child, Jean Houymet bought a plot of land measuring 2 arpents of frontage on the St Lawrence River, on the northern portion of the Isle of Orleans. He settled there, with his family, in the parish of Sainte-Famille. Jean and Renée had nine children, of which three boys and a girl (Jean, Louis, Pierre, and Marguerite) later married and bore descendants.

Jean Houymet died on November 18, 1687, at the age of 53 in Sainte-Famille and was buried in the parish the following day. The value of Jean Houymet's estate at the time of his death can be found in the inventory of his belongings in a contract dated October 26, 1688, written by the notary Vachon. This document reveals that Jean Houymet was relatively rich at that time. Renée Gagnon, his wife, died between 1695 and 1702.

Today, the majority of their descendants are living in Montreal and Laval regions in the province of Québec.

See also
 New France
 Quebec

References

 Recueil historique sur les Ouimet, Pauline Ouimet-Charron, 1999.
 Dictionnaire des descendants de Jean Ouimet et Renée Gagnon, Pierre Ouimet et al., 2000.
 Catalogue des Immigrants, 1632-1662, Marcel Trudel, 1983.

External links
 Official web site of l'Association des descendants de Jean Ouimet
 FFSQ - Fédération des familles-souches du Québec
 Bibliothèque et Archives nationales du Québec

1630s births
1687 deaths
People of New France
French emigrants to pre-Confederation Quebec
Immigrants to New France